SNAS may refer to:

Singapore National Academy of Science
Satellite Navigation Augmentation System, a proposed Chinese space-based navigation system
Société Nouvelle d'Aviation Sportive, a French aircraft manufacturer of the 2000s